Zhang Huiwen (born 12 June 1993) is a Chinese goalball player. She won a silver medal at the 2016 Summer Paralympics.

Zhang lost her vision following a brain injury at age 5. She began playing goalball in 2009 at age 16.

References

Female goalball players
1993 births
Living people
Sportspeople from Beijing
Paralympic goalball players of China
Paralympic silver medalists for China
Goalball players at the 2016 Summer Paralympics
Medalists at the 2016 Summer Paralympics
Paralympic medalists in goalball
Beijing Union University alumni